Goldasht-e Olya (also Romanized as Goldasht-e ‘Olyā; also known as Gondāshlū, Gondāshlū Ja’farī, Gondeshlū-ye Bālā, Gondeshlū-ye Ja‘farī, and Gundashlu) is a village in Majdabad Rural District, in the Central District of Marvdasht County, Fars Province, Iran. At the 2006 census, its population was 1,246, in 313 families.

References 

Populated places in Marvdasht County